Ronald Glen Jones (June 11, 1964 – June 4, 2006) was a professional baseball player for the Philadelphia Phillies during the late 1980s and early 1990s. He displayed great promise as a hitter, but his career was spoiled by two severe knee injuries.

Life and career
Born in Seguin, Texas, Jones was drafted in 1982 and 1983 but chose not to turn professional. Eventually, in 1984, he signed with the Phillies as a free agent. The stocky outfielder battled some problems with weight and injuries, but he displayed great hitting talent in the farm system. His ability at the plate and capable defense eventually earned him a spot with the big league club. However, after a promising first couple of months in August and September 1988, in April 1989 Jones suffered the first of two torn patellar tendons. The other, to his opposite knee, came in June 1990. Jones also came back from that injury; however, his time in the majors was all but finished. Nonetheless, he continued in the minors, Mexico, Taiwan, independent baseball leagues, and semi-pro ball through 2000.

Upon retirement, Jones began working as a hitting instructor and coach for youths, eventually forming the Big League Batting Academy in Houston, Texas, alongside another former major leaguer, Charlie Hayes. In June 2006, after Jones did not show up at the academy for a few days, he was found dead in his home. He is thought to have died of either an aneurysm, heart attack, or stroke.

References

External links
 SABR BioProject
 Big League Baseball Academy

1964 births
2006 deaths
Philadelphia Phillies players
Richmond Braves players
Sioux Falls Canaries players
Thunder Bay Whiskey Jacks players
Wharton County Pioneers baseball players
African-American baseball players
Bend Phillies players
Clearwater Phillies players
Jungo Bears players
American expatriate baseball players in Taiwan
American expatriate baseball players in Mexico
Leones de Yucatán players
Maine Guides players
Maine Phillies players
Olmecas de Tabasco players
Rio Grande Valley WhiteWings players
Saraperos de Saltillo players
Scranton/Wilkes-Barre Red Barons players
Shreveport Captains players
Sinon Bulls players
Tecolotes de los Dos Laredos players
20th-century African-American sportspeople
21st-century African-American people